Helena Edlund (born 1960) is a Swedish professor and molecular biologist. She received her Ph.D. from Umeå University in 1991. She is a professor in Molecular Developmental Biology at Umeå University where she researches Type 2 diabetes and β-cell function. She is one of the founders, along with Thomas Edlund and Olof Karlsson, of the biopharmaceutical company Betagenon.

In 2000, Edlund was the recipient of the Minkowski Prize given by the European Association for the Study of Diabetes (EASD) for her work in factors controlling beta-cell identity and glucose homeostasis. She is a member of the Royal Swedish Academy of Sciences. She has written numerous articles on beta cell differentiation, beta cell function, pancreatic development, and  Type 2 diabetes .

References

External links
Mini CV Helana Edlund Scientific Advisory Board, Oslo University Hospital

1960 births
Living people
Molecular biologists
Umeå University alumni
Diabetologists
Minkowski Prize recipients
Members of the Royal Swedish Academy of Sciences